Anuradha Roy is an Indian actress who is recognized for her work in Bengali cinema. She made her film debut with Ajoy Bandopadhyay's horror drama Karoti (1988). She is best known for her role in Utsab (2000) directed by Rituparno Ghosh and Bengali TV serial Rajeshwari where she played Rani Rashmoni

Filmography

 Tumi O Tumi
 Ami Achhi Sei Je Tomar (2013)
 Hathat Vishon Valo Lagchhe (2013)
 Hoyto Premer Jonno (2013)
 Hridoyer Shabdo (2013)
 Jodi Hridoye Lekho Naam (2013)
 Jug Jug Jio (2013)
 Samadhi (2013)
 Antore Shudhu Tumi (2013)
 Classmate (2013)
 Holud Pakhir Dana (2013)
 Antardaho (2013)
 Maach Misti & More (2013)
 Gundaraj (2013)
 Jaal (2012)
 Student No. 1 (2011)
 Achena Prem (2011)
 Love Connection (2010)
 Poth Jodi Na Shesh Hoy (2010)
 Preyashi (2010)
 Ganyer Meye Sovona (2010)
 Besh Korechhi Prem Korechhi (2010)
 Saptosur (2009)
 Neel Akasher Chandni (2009)
 Tumi Kar (2008)
 Biyer Lagna (2008)
 Shudhu Tomar Jonyo (2007)
 Bidhatar Lekha (2007)
 I Love You (2007)
 Mahaguru (2007)
 Nabab Nandini (2007)
 Rudra The Fire (2007)
 Sangharsha (2007)
 Agnipariksha (2006)
 Tapasya (2006)
 Nagardola (2005)
 Til Theke Tal (2005)
 Tobu Bhalobasi (2005)
 Kritodas (2004)
 Kuyasha (2004)
 Paribar (2004)
 Pratishodh (2004)
 Ram Lakshman (2004)
 Sajani (2004)
 Samudra Sakshi (2004)
 Andha Prem (2003)
 Arjun Aamar Naam (2003)
 Mayer Anchal (2003)
 Annadata (2002)
 Ektu Chhoan (2002)
 Manush Amanush (2002)
 Pratihinsa (2002)
 Prem Shakti (2002)
 Bangshadhar (2001)
 Bidhatar Khela (2001)
 Etai Swarga (2001)
 Jamaibabu Zindabad (2001)
 Rakhi Purnima (2001)
 Sud Asal (2001)
 Utsab (2001)
 Aamader Janani (2000)
 Bhalobashar Chhoan (2000)
 Harjit (2000)
 Mayna (2000)
 Rupasi Dohai Tomar (2000)
 Shatruta (2000)
 Swashurbari Zindabad (2000)
 Trishul (2000)
 Agni shikha (1999)
 Tumi Ele Tai (1999)
 Aamar Maa (1998)
 Chowdhury Paribar (1998)
 Sindurer Adhikar (1998)
 Mayar Bandhan (1997)
 Mittir Barir Chhoto Bou (1997)
 Nishpap Asami (1997)
 Banaphul (1996)
 Biyer Phul (1996)
 Jhinukmala (1996)
 Naginkanya (1995)
 Patibrata (1995)
 Sansar Sangram (1995)
 Sukher Asha (1995)
 Amriter Putra (1994)
 Biswas Abiswas (1994)
 Dhusar Godhuli (1994)
 Pratyaghat (1994)
 Tumi Je Aamar (1994)
 Amar Kahini (1993)
 Maan Samman (1993)
 Apan Par (1992)
 Dharma-Yuddha (1992)
 Indrajit (1992)
 Debar (1991)
 Maan Maryada (1991)
 Bhanga Gara (1990)
 Raja Badsha (1990)
 Karoti (1988)

References

External links
 

Indian film actresses
Living people
Bengali actresses
Actresses from Kolkata
Bengali Hindus
Indian Hindus
Year of birth missing (living people)
Actresses in Hindi cinema
Actresses in Bengali cinema
20th-century Indian actresses
21st-century Indian actresses